Brian Connell is a South African ethologist, photographer, conservationist, and author of a number of books.

Books

References

External links
Brian Connell official website
Just Done Productions Publishing website

South African writers
South African non-fiction writers
Living people
Year of birth missing (living people)